The Primetime Emmy Award for Outstanding Cinematography for a Series (One Hour) is an annual award presented as part of the Primetime Emmy Awards. From 1971 until 2008, all single-camera series competed together in a combined category. Awards for one-hour and half-hour series were divided in 2008 and the category ran until 2010. From 2011 to 2016, the awards were again combined for all single-camera series. They were redivided in 2017.

Winners and nominations

1950s
Outstanding Achievement in Cinematography

1960s

1970s
Outstanding Cinematography for a Series

Outstanding Cinematography for a Single-Camera Series

1980s

1990s

2000s

Outstanding Cinematography for a Single-Camera Series (One Hour)

2010s

Outstanding Cinematography for a Single-Camera Series

Outstanding Cinematography for a Single-Camera Series (One Hour)

2020s

Programs with multiple awards

3 wins
 Boardwalk Empire
 Columbo
 Law & Order
 Quantum Leap

2 wins
 The Crown
 CSI: Crime Scene Investigation
 Little House on the Prairie
 The Marvelous Mrs. Maisel
 Naked City
 The West Wing

Cinematographers with multiple awards

3 wins
 Jonathan Freeman
 Constantine Makris

2 wins
 Thomas Del Ruth
 Adriano Goldman
 M. David Mullen
 Jack Priestley
 William W. Spencer
 Ted Voigtlander
 Roy H. Wagner
 Michael W. Watkins
 Harry L. Wolf

Programs with multiple nominations

9 nominations
 Game of Thrones

7 nominations
 Little House on the Prairie

6 nominations
 Boardwalk Empire
 Breaking Bad
 CSI: Crime Scene Investigation

5 nominations
 Bonanza
 Chicago Hope
 Highway to Heaven
 Law & Order
 Mad Men
 Quantum Leap
 The West Wing
 The X-Files

4 nominations
 The Crown
 The Handmaid's Tale
 House of Cards
 JAG
 Kojak
 The Marvelous Mrs. Maisel
 Ozark
 The Sopranos

3 nominations
 Alias
 Amazing Stories
 Beauty and the Beast
 Columbo
 Hawaii Five-O
 Homeland
 The Loretta Young Show
 The Man in the High Castle
 The Mandalorian 
 Six Feet Under
 The Twilight Zone
 Westworld

2 nominations
 Ally McBeal
 Babylon 5
 Baretta
 Carnivàle
 Deadwood
 Dr. Quinn, Medicine Woman
 Euphoria
 Fame
 Fantasy Island
 Four Star Playhouse
 General Electric Theater
 The Good Wife
 Have Gun – Will Travel
 Jake and the Fatman
 Lost
 Magnum, P.I.
 The Man from U.N.C.L.E.
 Marcus Welby, M.D.
 Maverick
 Miami Vice
 Moonlighting
 Naked City
 Northern Exposure
 The Practice
 Roots
 Star Trek: The Next Generation
 Stranger Things
 The Tudors
 24
 Wagon Train
 The Young Indiana Jones Chronicles

Cinematographers with multiple nominations

13 nominations
 Ted Voigtlander

7 nominations
 Michael Slovis

6 nominations
 Thomas Del Ruth

5 nominations
 Phil Abraham
 Gerald Perry Finnerman
 John C. Flinn III 
 Jonathan Freeman

4 nominations
 John Bartley
 Joseph F. Biroc
 Haskell Boggs
 Hugo Cortina 
 Adriano Goldman
 Constantine Makris
 Christopher Manley
 William Margulies
 M. David Mullen
 Sol Negrin
 Jack Priestley
 Walter Strenge
 Michael W. Watkins

3 nominations
 Lloyd Ahern
 James R. Bagdonas 
 Guy Blanchard 
 Michael Bonvillain
 Norbert Brodine
 George T. Clemens
 George E. Diskant
 William Jurgensen 
 Jeffrey Jur 
 Stevan Larner
 Robert McLachlan
 Kramer Morgenthau
 John McPherson 
 Woody Omens
 Michael D. O'Shea 
 Robert Pittack 
 Richard M. Rawlings Jr.
 Howard Schwartz 
 William W. Spencer
 Roy H. Wagner
 William F. Whitely 
 Harry L. Wolf
 Ralph Woolsey

2 nominations
 Emmett Bergholz 
 Edward R. Brown 
 Paul Cameron
 Alan Caso
 Rodney Charters
 Robert E. Collins
 Billy Dickson
 John Elsenbach 
 Dana Gonzales
 Anette Haellmigk
 Robert B. Hauser
 James Hawkinson
 Winton C. Hoch
 Tim Ives
 David Klein
 Fred J. Koenekamp
 Sherman Kunkel 
 Ben Kutchins
 Enzo A. Martinelli
 Gregory Middleton
 Robert L. Morrison
 Brianne Murphy
 Fred Murphy
 Frank Prinzi
 Ousama Rawi
 Richard L. Rawlings 
 Marcell Rév 
 Bill Roe
 Marvin V. Rush
 Dennis Smith
 Roland 'Ozzie' Smith 
 John Toll
 Jonathan West 
 Kenneth Zunder

Notes

References

Cinematography for a One Hour Series
Awards for best cinematography